Parâkramabâhu VI was the first king of Kotte, ruling from 1410 until his death in 1467. He is the last great king in Sri Lanka who managed to unite the island under one flag. His rule is famous for the renaissance in Sinhalese literature, (especially poetry) due to the patronage of the king himself. Classical literature (prose and verse) as well as many rock inscriptions and royal grant letters (patent letters, sannas) have been found, rendering much information pertaining to this period.

Early life 
His father was Lameni Jayamahalena, and his mother was Sunethra Maha Devi. If so, he is the grandson of Parakramabahu V, who was Savulu Vijayabahu's son. Savulu Vijayabahu was the fifth to go by the name Vijayabahu. Another scholar states that Jayamahalena was the grandfather of Parakramabahu VI. However, he is supposed to belong to the family, that came after Parakramabahu V.

Reign

Kingship
Parakramabahu VI was allied with Ming China who forcibly dethroned Alakeshvara in favor of Anndra Megan Jeyashankar . As documented in Chinese records, Parakramabahu VI was elected by the Sinhalese present at the Ming court, nominated by the Ming emperor, and installed by Admiral Zheng He with the backing of his fleet.

During his reign, economic relations between the Ming dynasty and the Kotte kingdom increased; he sent alteast five diplomatic missions to China in order to confirm that sea piracy in the Sea of Kotte had been abolished. The Galle Trilingual inscription was also placed by Zheng He during this period.

Rebellion
King Parakramabahu VI suppressed the revolts in Malayarata. The chiefs of Vanni who wielded power there, were defeated by this king.
In 1435, a south Indian invasion from the Vijayanagara Empire, is recorded. Sri Lankan sources say that the king that started the invasion successfully but south Indian records contradict this. Soon after this time, king Parâkramabâhu VI directed a naval attack on south Indian ports, resulting from a dispute that arose after the incident of stealing a cargo ship by an Indian called Rayan Malavar around the year 1443.

Conquering Yapa Patuna
This battle was led by king Parâkramabâhu VI's adopted son, Prince Sapumal. Selalihini Sandeshaya records that the prince returned after winning the Yapa Patuna (Jaffna), about year 1449. The king took advantage that AryaChakravarthi could no longer get military assistance from Vijayanagara. As troops advanced across Mannar to Jaffna by land, naval forces must have cut south Indian assistance by patrolling the Palk Strait. The first fierce battle happened in JavaKotte (Chavakacheri) near Elephant pass. Later Jaffna was attacked and Arya chakravarthi was forced to retreat to India.

Demise
In year 1463, there was a rebellion in the hill country and Sena sammatha Wikramabahu became king of Senkadagala. The king died in 1467. And his grand son Jayabahu VI became king. But this was followed by much political turmoil. The stability of king Parâkramabâhu VI would not return for centuries to come.

Contribution to literature
He also played a main role in the contribution to literature. King Parakramabahu VI showed a great interest in literature and arts. Also the offering of Royal favour is influenced to flourish of Sinhalese Literature. His period is considered as the Golden Era in Sinhalese Literature. That was the heyday of 'Sandesha Poetry.'

Contribution to Buddhism
He had built a 'Dalada Maligawa', a 3-floor building that became the repository of tooth relic. In addition to that he constructed a temple in honour of his mother and it is presently the Sunethradevi Pirivena at Pepiliyana.

See also 
 Sapumal Kumaraya
 Kingdom of Kotte
 Saddharmarathnakaraya

References

Citations

Sources 

 Shrilankave Ithihasaya, Department of educational publications, Sri Lanka.

Monarchs of Kotte
P
Buddhist monarchs
 Sinhalese Buddhist monarchs
House of Siri Sanga Bo
P